John Bamber (11 April 1895 – 26 May 1973) was an English footballer who played as a half back for Liverpool, Leicester City, Tranmere Rovers and Prescot Cables, as well as for the English national side.

References

1895 births
1973 deaths
English footballers
England international footballers
Liverpool F.C. players
Leicester City F.C. players
Tranmere Rovers F.C. players
Prescot Cables F.C. players
Footballers from St Helens, Merseyside
English Football League players
Association football wing halves
English Football League representative players